Neodythemis is a genus of dragonfly in the family Libellulidae, known as junglewatchers. It contains the following species:
Neodythemis afra 
Neodythemis arnoulti 
Neodythemis campioni 
Neodythemis fitzgeraldi  – Powdered Junglewatcher
Neodythemis hildebrandti 
Neodythemis infra  – Blackwater Junglewatcher
Neodythemis katanga  – Katanga Junglewatcher
Neodythemis klingi 
Neodythemis munyaga 
Neodythemis nyungwe 
Neodythemis pauliani 
Neodythemis preussi 
Neodythemis scalarum 
Neodythemis takamandensis  – Bizarre Junglewatcher
Neodythemis trinervulata

References

Libellulidae
Anisoptera genera
Taxa named by Ferdinand Karsch
Taxonomy articles created by Polbot